Ron Smith (13 September 1934 – 1 October 2009) was  a former Australian rules footballer who played with Fitzroy in the Victorian Football League (VFL).

Notes

External links 
		
		
		
		
		

1934 births
2009 deaths
Australian rules footballers from Victoria (Australia)
Fitzroy Football Club players